General elections were held in Kuwait on 23 February 1981. A total of 447 candidates contested the election, which saw pro-government candidates remain the largest bloc in Parliament. Voter turnout was 89.8%.

Results

References

Kuwait
Election
Elections in Kuwait
Non-partisan elections